Tanqueray (or Tanquerey)  is an English and French surname of Norman origin. Notable people with the surname include:

Anne Tanqueray (1691-1733), English silversmith
Ingrid Tanqueray (born 1988), French basketball player
Paul Tanqueray (1905–1991), English photographer
Charles Tanqueray (1810-1868), British distiller who founded the Tanqueray gin

See also 
The Second Mrs Tanqueray
Tancred

References

Surnames of Norman origin
Germanic-language surnames
English-language surnames
French-language surnames